The Turkey national under-19 football team is the national under-19 football team of Turkey and is controlled by the Turkish Football Federation. The team competes in the UEFA European Under-19 Football Championship, held every year. The Under-19 UEFA tournament originally began as the FIFA Junior Tournament between 1948 and 1954. It has since been renamed a number of times, most notably referred to as the UEFA European U-18 Championship between 1981 and 2001. The tournament was renamed as the UEFA European U-19 Championship in 2002, but importantly the overall statistics are collated from 1948. In addition, every even year, the top five teams from the respective UEFA European Under-19 Football Championship compete in the FIFA U-20 World Cup the following year.

Competitive record

UEFA European U-19 Championship record*

*The tournament originally began in 1948 and has had a number of different names. The tournament was renamed as the UEFA European U-19 Championship in 2002, but importantly the overall statistics are collated from 1948.
**Draws include knockout matches decided by penalty shoot-out.
***Silver background colour indicates that Turkey finished as runner-up.
Q - Denotes qualified for the FIFA U-20 World Cup held the following year.

Individual awards
In addition to team victories, Turkish players have won individual awards at UEFA European Under-19 Football Championship.

*Award was shared with other players.

Results and fixtures

2022 UEFA European Under-19 Championship

Qualifiers

Elite Round – Group 1

Current squad
 The following players were called up for the 2023 UEFA European Under-19 Championship qualification matches.
 Match dates: 21, 24 and 27 September 2022
 Caps and goals correct as of:''' 21 September 2022, after the match against

See also
 Turkey men's national football team
Turkey men's national under-21 football team
 Turkey men's national under-20 football team
 Turkey men's national under-17 football team
 Turkey women's national football team
 Turkey women's national under-21 football team
 Turkey women's national under-19 football team
 Turkey women's national under-17 football team

References

under
European national under-19 association football teams